A Bachelor of Information Technology (abbreviations BIT or BInfTech) is an undergraduate academic degree that generally requires three to five years of study. While the degree has a major focus on computers and technology, it differs from a Computer Science degree in that students are also expected to study management and information science, and there are reduced requirements for mathematics.

International variations

Australia
In BIT is a three-year or four-year undergraduate degree.

At the University of Technology, Sydney (UTS), a BIT
 is a three-year, co-op scholarship degree with two six-month job placements.
At the University of New South Wales a BIT is referred to as "Business in Information technology" and is also a co-op scholarship degree that lasts four years.

At the University of Sydney a BIT is a four-year technical program, related to degrees such as Computer Science and Software Engineering.

At Swinburne University of Technology, a BIT is a three-year co-op scholarship degree incorporating two six-month job placements.

At RMIT University a BIT is offered as a three-year program, giving the student the choice of a majors These major are: Application Programming, Business Applications, Multimedia Design, Network Programming, System Administration and Web Systems

The state of the BIT program in Australia is unstable, as many universities offer it as a technical program while others as a business, e-commerce related program. The Australian Computer Society recognizes all BIT degrees, however Engineers Australia only recognises BIT degrees that are technical.

Canada
In Canada, Carleton University and Algonquin College have jointly created four programs under the Bachelor of Information Technology degree: Information Resource Management, Interactive Multimedia and Design, Network Technology, and Optical Systems and Sensors. University of Ontario Institute of Technology also offers streams in Networking & Information Technology Security, and Game Development and Entrepreneurship.

Puerto Rico
In Puerto Rico several universities offer Bachelor of Information Technology degrees with specializations in Networking, Security, and/or Programming; typically awarded after four years of full-time study and the completion of a supervised project or internship. Universities in Puerto Rico offering this specialized education via in-person and online modalities include Columbia Central University, EDP University of Puerto Rico, and National University College.

South Africa
In South Africa the University of Pretoria offers the Baccalaureus in Information Technology (BIT) degree as a four-year undergraduate programme. The University of Pretoria is also the first university in South Africa to offer this degree. Upon successful completion of a BIT degree a student can continue with either a part-time or full-time MIT programme at the University of Pretoria to round off his or her professional training or enter the workforce.
The BIT course includes, but is not limited to, the following subjects: Business Management, Economics, Statistics, Mathematics, English, Programming and Advanced Programming, Systems Development, Philosophy, Financial Accounting, Data Structures and Algorithms, Operating Systems, Databases, Networks, Artificial Intelligence, Information Organization and Retrieval, Computer Architecture, Software Engineering, Multimedia.
As an alternative to BIT, the University of Pretoria's Computer Science Department offers two three-year degrees, BSc CS and BSc IT.

United Arab Emirates
In UAE, Skyline University College offers 4 years Bachelor of Science in Information Technology enterprise computing.

See also
Bachelor of Computing
Bachelor of Software Engineering
Bachelor of Computer Information Systems
Bachelor of Computer Engineering
Bachelor of Science in Information Technology
Doctor of Information Technology
Master of Science in Information Technology

References

Information Technology Bachelor of
Computer science education
Information technology education
Information technology qualifications